Break Ke Baad is a 2010 Indian Hindi-language romantic comedy film directed by Danish Aslam and starring Deepika Padukone and Imran Khan. Shahana Goswami and Yudhishtr Urs play siblings while Sharmila Tagore, Navin Nischol (in his last role before his death in 2011), and Lillete Dubey have supporting roles. The major part of the film was shot in Mauritius. The film is produced by Kunal Kohli under the banner of Kunal Kohli Productions. The music for the film has been composed by Vishal–Shekhar with lyrics by Prasoon Joshi. This is the first time that Vishal–Shekhar and Prasoon have worked together on a film soundtrack. The music was released on 15 October 2010 to mixed reviews. It was also Sharmila Tagore's last film prior to her retirement after her husband's death, until she would make her comeback post the COVID-19 in 2022.

Plot
Abhay Gulati and Aaliya Khan have been friends since childhood. Aaliya has always loved acting since her mother is an actress. Her father leaves her and her mother. Abhay likes cooking but his father wants him to take care of his business. Eventually Abhay and Aaliya start dating but Aaliya does not want to marry. An opportunity comes for Aaliya to go to Australia for acting school which she takes. She goes to Australia where she has to live with her strict aunt. She then moves into a bungalow where a group of young people live for cheap. Abhay becomes paranoid and goes to Australia, annoying Aaliya because she feels he doesn't trust her and they break up. Abhay opens a restaurant and it becomes a big hit. Aaliya and Abhay slowly become friends again. Aaliya finishes acting school and Abhay's father finds out about his restaurant. Abhay and Aaliya's mother, Ayesha, come for Aaliya's graduation. Aaliya gets an opportunity to work in a movie and signs the contract without telling her mother, thereby enraging her. Soon Abhay leaves Aaliya too, because she is selfish. Realizing she is wrong and that she can't go on without her mother's support, she quits the movie and rushes back to India to repair their relationship. Soon, her mother realises that Aaliya is strong to face the world and can come to terms with her mistakes more easily than her mother herself was capable of, so she allows her to act in the movie and sends her back again. However, soon she return to the same Australian city for shooting her movie, and meets Abhay, who tells her he still hasn't moved on. She apparently convinces him to move on and get married. However, she is stunned when she learns from another friend that Abhay is going to be married. Puzzled as to why he didn't tell her first about the news, Aaliya rushes to Abhay's house and finds him getting ready to get married. Aaliya begs him to re-think his decision, proposing to him with the very ring he was considering for her once upon a time. She confesses her love to him and tells him that she is really in love with him. Abhay, realising Aaliya's regret and love for him, shows her his wedding invitation which has her name, implying he intended to marry her all along. She is happy and they embrace, making up. The end credits show that the two are married, and have a daughter named Sara.

Cast
 Deepika Padukone as Aaliya Khan / Aaliya Abhay Gulati aka Al
 Ziyah Vastani as Young Aaliya
 Imran Khan as Abhay Gulati / Gelato 
 Namit Shah as Young Abhay
 Parzaan Dastur as Teenage Abhay
 Sharmila Tagore as Ayesha Khan, Aaliya's mother
 Shahana Goswami as Nadia "Nads"
 Yudhishtar Urs as Cyrus
 Lillete Dubey as Pammi Gulati, Abhay's aunt
 Naveen Nischol as Jeet Gulati, Abhay's father 
 Suparna Marwah as Khaala, Ayesha's sister 
 Divyaalakshmi as Preeti Gulati
 Rohan Mantri as Jai
 Neelu Kohli as Kamal Gulati, Abhay's mother 
 Shankar Sachdev as Javed Bhai
 Gaurav Nanda as Theatre Director
 Kamlesh Ojha as Rishabh Malhotra 
 Alexander Koenio as Daniel Trip
 Nyesha Arora as Sara Gulati, Abhay and Aaliya's daughter

Music

Release

Critical reception
Break Ke Baad met with mixed-to-positive reviews from critics, with praise directed towards Padukone's performance.

Filmfare critic Sukanya Venkatraghavan gave it its best review, calling it "possibly the best love story we have seen all this year and maybe last year too."

More positive reviews included critics Rohit Sukhwani, who tagged the film as a very pleasant and matured love story and Padukone was again at her best. Rajeev Masand, who said that director Danish Aslam "makes a respectable debut with a reasonably engaging film." and Anupama Chopra, who praised Padukone's performance as "her best to date".

Negative reviews included Taran Adarsh, who stated that even though the movie had a "vibrant Khan and Padukone as its USP", it also had a "faulty and an unpersuasive screenplay as is its major stumbling block".

Box office
Break Ke Baad grossed Rs. 205 million over its first weekend. In the US, the collections over the first day were about $114,742 as compared to lead actor Khan's previous release I Hate Luv Storys (2010) which collected $50,176.

Award nominations

References

External links
 
 

2010s Hindi-language films
2010 directorial debut films
Films scored by Vishal–Shekhar
Indian romantic comedy films
2010 romantic comedy films
2010 films